Air Chief Marshal Djoko Suyanto (born 2 December 1950) was the Commander of the Indonesian National Armed Forces from 2006 to 2007. After ending his services as the commander, he served as the Coordinating Minister for Legal, Political and Security Affairs in President Susilo Bambang Yudhoyono's Second United Indonesia Cabinet.

Suyanto graduated from the Indonesian Air Force Academy (Akademi Angkatan Udara, AAU) in 1973 and rapidly gained his pilot's brevet.  He underwent further training Australia and the United States, where he trained at the United States Air Force Weapons School at Nellis Air Force Base, before becoming a flying instructor.  He then served successively as the commander of No. 14 (Air Combat) Squadron flying F-5 Tiger II, the commander of Iswahyudi Air Force Base, the commander of the National Air Defense Sector and the commander of the Air Force Education Command.

Djoko Suyanto was appointed as the Commander of Air Force Operations Command 2 - East in 2001.  Two years later he took up the post of Air Force Operations Advisor at Air Force Headquarters and in 2005 he was appointed Chief of Staff of the Air Force. When, in 2006, Djoko Suyanto became Commander of the National Armed Forces, he was the first Air Force officer to hold this post.

Air Chief Marshal Djoko Suyanto is known as one of Indonesia’s best fighter pilots.

At his confirmation hearing he was quoted as saying:

In September 2006, Suyanto complained of human rights objections to the New York Agreement trading of West New Guinea to Indonesia stating "I get information from our representative in the UN that some NGOs have begun persuading bishop Desmond Tutu to help them lobbying Papua case in the UN," and "We must be alert on the move of the NGO's that use famous people for their goal of breaking Papua from Indonesia."

References

External links
 Biography
 English edition of China's People Daily Online

|-

|-

|-

|-

1950 births
Living people
Indonesian Muslims
Javanese people
People from Madiun
Indonesian Air Force air marshals
Government ministers of Indonesia
Chiefs of Staff of the Indonesian Air Force
Commanders of the Indonesian National Armed Forces